The Tirtanadi Water Tower is a water tower dating back to 1908 in city of Medan, North Sumatra, Indonesia. It is operated by a municipally-owned water company PDAM Tirtanadi.

The water tower was built in 1908 and owned by NV. Water Leiding Maatschappij Ajer Bersih company, which was established in 1905 and belonged to the Dutch East Indies government.

References 

Buildings and structures in Medan